The 2009–10 Football League One was Wycombe Wanderers F.C.'s sixteenth season of League football. This article shows statistics of the club's players in the season, and also lists all matches that the club has played during the season.

Match results

Legend

Football League One

FA Cup

League Cup

Football League Trophy

Squad statistics
Appearances for competitive matches only

See also
2009–10 in English football
Wycombe Wanderers F.C.

References

External links
 Wycombe Wanderers official website
 Wycombe Wanderers 2009–10 season players stats at Soccerbase

Wycombe Wanderers F.C. seasons
Wycombe Wanderers